Lauren Branning is a fictional character from the BBC soap opera EastEnders. The role was originated by Madeline Duggan, who first appeared on 3 July 2006. Duggan played the role for four years until her exit on 23 June 2010. Three months later, on 27 September 2010, the role was recast with Jacqueline Jossa. In August 2014, Jossa announced that she was expecting her first child. In December 2014, Jossa filmed her final scenes prior to taking maternity leave, which aired on 24 February 2015, following the show's 30th anniversary celebrations. She returned temporarily on 14 September 2015 for her father's murder trial before departing again on 2 October 2015. Lauren made a permanent return on 27 May 2016. In September 2017, it was announced that Jossa and Lorna Fitzgerald, who plays Lauren's sister Abi, had been axed by executive consultant John Yorke. Jossa finished filming with the show on 11 January 2018, and Lauren departed on 16 February 2018.Lauren returned to the show on 12 December 2022 for the funeral of her step-grandmother Dot Cotton (June Brown). 

Her storylines have included running over her father Max Branning (Jake Wood), alcoholism, supporting her mother Tanya Branning (Jo Joyner) through cervical cancer, her friendships with Lucy Beale (Hetti Bywater) and Whitney Dean (Shona McGarty), a relationship with her cousin Joey Branning (David Witts), an affair with a married alcoholic Jake Stone (Jamie Lomas), engagement to Peter Beale (Ben Hardy), struggling to deal with Lucy's murder, giving birth to Peter's son Louie, a relationship with Steven Beale (Aaron Sidwell) following the ending of her relationship with Peter, becoming attracted to Max's boss Josh Hemmings (Eddie Eyre) who also becomes her own boss, having an abortion after becoming pregnant by Steven, dealing with his death, finding out her sister Abi is pregnant by Steven after an affair, working against Weylands plans for development on Albert Square, falling from The Queen Victoria roof alongside Abi, and dealing with Abi's death following the fall.

Storylines

The eldest child and daughter of Max Branning (Jake Wood) and Tanya Branning (Jo Joyner), Lauren moves to Walford with her parents and younger sister, Abi Branning (Lorna Fitzgerald) in July 2006. In 2007, Lauren discovers that her father is having an affair with her half-brother Bradley Branning's (Charlie Clements) fiancée, Stacey Slater (Lacey Turner), after accidentally filming them kissing on her video camera. Lauren burns the footage onto a DVD and it is played on Christmas Day, exposing Max and Stacey's affair and resulting in the breakdown of Max and Tanya's marriage. Romantically involved with Peter Beale (Thomas Law), Max disapproves of their relationship and demands Peter end the romance but ends up throttling him when they meet secretly in the café. Shortly after, Max is left comatose, following a hit-and-run. It is revealed that Lauren is responsible but Tanya confesses to the crime and is imprisoned, pleading guilty to attempted murder. This distresses Lauren who confesses to the police and is found guilty of GBH with intent, and is sentenced to two years under supervision.

In 2008, paedophile Tony King (Chris Coghill), stepfather to her best friend, Whitney Dean (Shona McGarty), starts grooming her to replace Whitney. When Tony's paedophilia is revealed, Lauren is shocked to learn about his intentions. Unnerved, Lauren dumps Peter, who tells his friends that he and Lauren had a sexual experience in the allotments. However, the couple plan a reunion and Lauren tells him she is ready to have sex, but Max bans them from seeing each other. Lauren leaves Walford when the extent of Max's debt is revealed by bailiffs who remove the family's possessions. She returns briefly at Christmas, and dumps Peter again before seeing him kiss Zsa Zsa Carter (Emer Kenny), causing a catfight between her, Zsa Zsa and Whitney. She attends Bradley's funeral after he falls from the roof of The Queen Victoria public house, while attempting to evade arrest by the police for the murder of Archie Mitchell (Larry Lamb). She celebrates her sixteenth birthday at a party in R&R nightclub, where her uncle Jack Branning (Scott Maslen) is shot by Kylie (Elarica Gallacher). After attending Abi's birthday dinner, Lauren informs her father that she is going  to spend the summer at a summer camp in the United States.

Lauren (now played by Jacqueline Jossa) returns from America earlier than expected, after being expelled from school for smoking cannabis. She reveals that she has a new boyfriend, Edward Brooks (Luke Striffler), but they split up because of the distance. Lauren attends her cousin Billie Jackson's (Devon Anderson) birthday party and as a present, she gives him alcohol and he is found dead of alcohol poisoning the next morning. Billie's mother, Carol (Lindsey Coulson) attacks Lauren, blaming her for encouraging Billie to drink. Lauren suspects that Max killed Archie after he tells her that Bradley was not the culprit and she notes his violent tendencies when he confronts Jay Brown (Jamie Borthwick) for making crude sexual remarks after she rejects his attempt to proposition her. Lauren confronts Max and he tells her that he is not the killer but knows who is; after seeing Max and Stacey together, Lauren realises that Stacey is the killer and tricks a confession out of her, which she records on her mobile phone. Lauren threatens to go the police, but agrees to keep quiet after discovering that Archie raped Stacey. However, on Christmas Day, Lauren hands Janine Butcher (Charlie Brooks) the recording and Stacey flees after Janine exposes her. Lauren develops a crush on Whitney's half-brother, Ryan Malloy (Neil McDermott), and they begin an affair. However, the relationship is threatened when Tanya finds out and the relationship ends when he flees after killing Rob Grayson (Jody Latham), who had been sexually exploiting Whitney for financial gain.

Lauren discovers that Max and Tanya are having an affair, despite Tanya now being married to Greg Jessop (Stefan Booth), Lauren threatens to kill Max unless the affair ends, but it secretly continues. The affair is soon exposed, causing Max to leave Walford. Lauren is angered by Tanya's actions, but is devastated to learn that Tanya has been diagnosed with cervical cancer. Lauren promises to support her but struggles to cope with her mother's illness. She starts drinking excessively and almost ends Darren Miller (Charlie G. Hawkins) and Jodie Gold's (Kylie Babbington) relationship by having sex with Darren in the car lot – hours before the wedding. She also casually dates Tyler Moon (Tony Discipline) until realising Whitney is still in love with him. Max returns to Walford, and when Lauren learns that Tanya has stopped her treatment, begs him to stay and reveals her illness so he stays. Lauren's rebellion continues and she reunites with her old friend Lucy Beale (Hetti Bywater) at Pat Evans' (Pam St Clement) funeral. After getting drunk at the funeral, she is berated by her parents and given a private consultation with a GP. Lauren withdraws from school, and is employed at the car lot. She resumes drinking and tries to conceal this from her parents. Her drinking is so heavy that, on a night out, Lucy tells her to go home but Lauren ignores her, insisting that she is fine. Lucy loses her and she is found passed out in the street. Lauren tells her parents her drink was spiked before stating she is mature enough to make decisions. She then decides to move out. On her 18th birthday, a drunken Lauren belatedly arrives at a family party, organised by Tanya. After being sick, Lauren admits to her parents that she is uncontrollable and promises not to drink any more. She moves back home after not being able to cope with the laziness of her housemates. Lauren and Lucy go out where a drunken Lauren shares a kiss with a stranger, Dan, who drags her into his car. After Lucy manages to drag her out, they argue and Lauren storms off. Lucy finds her unconscious and takes her to hospital but Lauren discharges herself. Lauren returns home to find Lucy has already told Max, Tanya and Ian everything. Angry, Lauren argues with her family and leaves, meeting Dan. After she rejects his advances, Lauren goes to Lucy's house and Lucy tells her that she does not want anything more to do with her.

Lauren meets her cousin, Joey Branning (David Witts), and is attracted to him. Her friendship with Lucy begins to improve after Lucy's father Ian Beale (Adam Woodyatt) disappears and Lauren helps find him. Joey and Lucy start dating but Lauren learns  that Joey had cheated with Whitney, and urges her to tell Lucy. Lucy ends the relationship and the girls take revenge by handcuffing him to playground equipment. Lauren decides to free him so he does not lose his job, and he tells her she is jealous that she did not get a kiss, so she slaps him. Joey is working at R&R when he sees Lauren flirting with a group of men so he throws them out and takes Lauren home. Lauren drunkenly kisses Joey but he rejects her. The following day, Joey explains that he rejected her because she was drunk and they kiss again. Lauren realises she cannot be with her cousin, so resists. Eventually, sexual tension mounts between them and they start a secret relationship. Joey's father Derek Branning (Jamie Foreman) finds out when he sees Joey and Lauren passionately kissing in the car lot office. Derek threatens Lauren so she and Joey plan to leave Walford. As they drive away in Derek's car, a drunk Lauren loses control of the car and crashes into a shop. Derek helps rescue them from the burning building and makes Joey take the blame for the crash. At the hospital, Lauren tells Tanya about her relationship with Joey and Derek blackmails Joey to end it. Heartbroken and distraught, Lauren continues to drink and Tanya realises that Joey is still in love with Lauren. Lauren later drunkenly reveals her relationship with Joey to the rest of her family. Joey leaves Walford after Derek dies but returns and reunites with Lauren, where Lucy witnesses them kissing. When trying to justify her relationship, Lauren is shocked when Lucy calls her selfish and undeserving of Joey's love, so Lauren considers telling the police the truth about the car crash, but Joey convinces her not to. Lauren and Joey's relationship is publicly revealed, though people start to accept it. Lauren discovers that Tanya has lied about missing a hospital appointment, and as Tanya refuses to talk, Lauren starts drinking again. Lauren destroys her mother's wedding gown and cake before Tanya and Max remarry. She later bonds with Max's secret wife, Kirsty Branning (Kierston Wareing), upsetting Tanya.

Lauren finds out that Kirsty is pregnant, unaware that Kirsty is lying. At a party, Lucy spikes Lauren's drink so she drunkenly reveals that Kirsty is pregnant. Lauren falls out with Joey, who breaks up with her over her behaviour. She applies for a job as a waitress with Whitney at Ian's new restaurant but Lucy gets Joey to be Lauren's test customer so Lauren will fail. Whitney gets the job but purposely withdraws so that Lauren gets the job instead. She tries to make Joey jealous by kissing Tyler, who is engaged to Whitney, but it fails and Whitney ends their friendship and Lucy offers the job to Whitney. Lauren's drinking gets worse, though she believes she is not alcohol and tricks her step-grandmother Dot Branning (June Brown) to give her money, which she uses to buy alcohol. Tanya is angry when she discovers this. Lauren then steals £20 from her grandmother's purse and when Tanya discovers this, she compares her to her aunt, Rainie Cross (Tanya Franks). Disgusted, Lauren attempts to buy more alcohol but Kirsty refuses to serve her, following Tanya's wishes. Lauren walks outside and confides in Joey but Lucy sees this and starts intimidating Lauren so she punches Lucy and smashes the café window. Lauren is arrested but Lucy decides not to press charges. Ian gives Lauren her waitress job back, but is sacked on the opening night for getting drunk and spills drink on a guest. Tanya and Max find bottles in Lauren's bedroom and decide to keep her locked in the house. She believes Lauren is showing no signs of withdrawal but Lauren reveals she has been drinking vodka from a water bottle, so Tanya realises she is addicted. Tanya keeps Lauren locked in her room but her withdrawal leads her to climb out of the window and Lauren says that nobody can stop her from drinking if she wants to. The next day, Tanya tells Lauren to leave after she destroys Abi's revision notes, and she stays with Max and Kirsty. Tanya asks Peter (now played by Ben Hardy) to spend time with Lauren, but their date is sabotaged by Lucy, so Lauren gets drunk again and leaves with a group of strangers. When she returns, her skin and eyes are yellow and she collapses in pain, so she is taken to hospital and diagnosed with alcoholic hepatitis. She is warned that she could die if she doesn't stop drinking. Lauren returns and sees Joey so tries to find him. She confronts Lucy over her relationship with Joey, but Lucy refuses to answer, so Lauren concludes that they are together and tries to get a drink but is refused service. Tanya takes her home, where she admits that she cannot cope with her parents'  constant arguing. Ultimately, Tanya blames herself and takes Lauren to a clinic in Exeter, believing a change of scene could help.

Lauren, now a recovering alcoholic, returns to Walford and dislikes how people treat her, until Abi reminds her of the hurt she caused. Lauren reconciles and is heartbroken to discover that Joey slept with Whitney while she was away. Lauren leaves, taking a drink with her but chooses not to drink it. She attends counselling and meets Jake Stone (Jamie Lomas). She sees that he is married but learns that is separated. Lauren falls in love with him but finds out that he is still married to Sadie Young (Kate Magowan), they split up but resume their affair, Max catches them and orders Lauren to end the relationship. Later that day, Joey asks Lauren to leave Walford with him but she decides to stay and resumes her affair with Jake.  They are caught by Bella Young (Isobelle Molloy) when she walks in on Lauren getting dressed. Understanding how Bella feels, Lauren ends the affair. When Sadie learns of this, Lauren attempts to apologise to her but learns that Sadie and Bella have left. She tries to persuade Jake not to drink again but he angrily throws a bottle of wine at Lauren and injuring her face; however, she forgives him before he leaves Walford. Lauren is stunned to see Stacey in The Vic, Stacey tells Lauren she is not staying but they meet again at Dot's house. Cora decides to call the police, but Lauren stops her and makes amends with Stacey as they talk about Bradley. She overhears Max and Stacey talking about a recent kiss they had and is agitated, asking her to stay away from Max. She overlooks what she heard when Stacey reveals she is waiting for the police to arrest her for murdering Archie because she wants to clear Bradley's name. Lauren avoids Jake when he returns to Walford as he has fallen off the wagon and is staying on Ian Beale's sofa.

Lucy asks Lauren to go into business with her. Although initially reluctant, Lauren agrees and they set up "LB Lettings". Lauren becomes suspicious that Lucy is dating Jake when he sets up the website for their business and Lucy begins arranging secret meetings. Lucy soothes her anxieties but she is seeing Max. Soon after, Lucy is found dead and Lauren is devastated. She leans on Peter for support in her grief, and is tempted to drink again but Cora talks her out of it. Determined to overcome her grief, Lauren starts up the business again and finds an email from someone wanting to meet on the night Lucy died. Believing Lucy went instead of her, Lauren tells the police but is not taken seriously, so she arranges to meet them herself. She is shocked when the person is revealed to be Jake and he chases her through Walford to try and stop her from going to the police. However, she does and he is arrested, although Lauren clearly has doubts if he did kill Lucy.

When Peter falls out with his girlfriend, Lola Pearce (Danielle Harold), Lauren comforts him and they kiss. However, Peter feels bad for cheating on Lola and leaves, but it is clear Lauren has feelings for him. Jake is released when evidence clears him of any involvement and makes peace with Lauren before leaving. Lauren starts dating Dean Wicks (Matt Di Angelo) after they have a one-night stand but is shocked when Peter breaks up with Lola and tells Lauren he loves her after kissing her again. Lauren tells him that she wants to be with Dean and Peter vows to wait for her. When Peter is about to visit New Zealand, Lauren ends her relationship with Dean and tells Peter she loves him. Lauren and Peter later begin to get paranoid when they are followed. When they get a car registration, DS Summerhayes finds that it is a police car signed out to DS Cameron Bryant (Glen Wallace) but she tells everyone that the registration number belongs to a reporter. On Halloween night, she encounters a mysterious person in a Halloween mask who follows her throughout the evening. This is later revealed to be Abi.

Peter asks Lauren to marry him. Lauren accepts, but after finding out that Peter was selling drugs to Lucy, she tells him that she cannot marry him.  On New Year's Day 2015, Max's girlfriend Emma Summerhayes (Anna Acton) is killed in a car accident after meeting someone who she thinks killed Lucy. Although Max tears up Emma's case notes, Lauren finds most of the pages and puts them together, suspicious about who killed Lucy. Lauren asks Peter to marry her and he accepts. However, after finding a previously torn off piece of a page from Emma's case files and trying to use Emma's phone, Lauren starts to doubt if she should marry Peter and drinks most of a half-bottle of whisky in Max's office. When Lauren nearly faints, Stacey buys her a test and discovers that Lauren is pregnant. Stacey confronts her about it but Lauren reveals that she knows who killed Lucy, but refuses to divulge the identity to the police. When Stacey calls the police, she is upset at her inability to keep a secret but hands in most of Emma's case files, while keeping the torn-off piece. She writes a card addressed to Jane, saying that Lucy was killed at home, and abruptly leaves to book an abortion. However, during the consultation, Peter interrupts her and offers to support her through all her issues. Lauren says she is confused and that she knows what happened to Lucy, leading him to discover the truth about the murder at home. When Peter decides to emigrate to New Zealand, he asks Lauren to go with him. She initially refuses, planning to join Tanya in Devon but after he tells her that his brother Bobby Beale (Eliot Carrington) is Lucy's killer, she changes her mind and decides to go to New Zealand. They dispose of Emma's remaining evidence and SIM card, deciding not to tell the police about Bobby being Lucy's killer. She says goodbye to Max and Abi and leaves with Peter, taking an outfit for their unborn child with them.

A heavily pregnant Lauren returns for Max's murder trial, saying she knows who killed Lucy. As she threatens to tell everyone about Bobby, her waters break. She later gives birth to a baby boy who she names Louie, in honour of Peter's great-grandmother, Lou Beale (Anna Wing). Lauren convinces Abi to stop Max from going to prison and tells Jane Beale (Laurie Brett) that she is going to tell the truth but Max is found guilty, thanks to Phil bribing the jury foreman. Max is sentenced to 21 years imprisonment. Max discovers Lauren knew that he was innocent and disowns her. Lauren makes a statement to the Police claiming that Bobby killed Lucy but they do not believe her and she returns to New Zealand with Louie, vowing to come back and clear Max's name.

In May 2016, Bobby puts Jane in a coma and confesses to killing Lucy, so Ian's mother Kathy Sullivan (Gillian Taylforth) telephones Lauren and tells Ian that she and Peter are returning. However, when Lauren arrives with Louie, Ian is surprised to see his stepson Steven Beale (Aaron Sidwell) instead of Peter. Lauren tries to reconcile with an angry Abi, who is furious that Lauren did not tell her that Bobby killed Lucy. Lauren and Steven try to make Ian understand their relationship and why Peter has not returned. When Max is due to have a court hearing following Bobby's confession, Lauren and Abi write a letter saying they will wait for him in the pub, asking Stacey to deliver it. Stacey returns, saying she missed the hearing but passed the letter to his solicitor. Max is released but does not meet Lauren, so she goes home. The letter is returned and she runs outside to see Max leaving in a taxi. Lauren helps Abi get her job back in The Vic and decides to party with her friends. Lauren catches Abi and Lee and assumes that Abi is making a move on him, however Abi drunkenly reveals that she and Lee previously had sex. Lauren promises not to tell Whitney even though Steven tells her to. That same day, Lauren helps Whitney do a pregnancy test, which is positive. Lauren later warns Lee that she knows about his sex with Abi but says she will not say anything because it would mean ruining Whitney's happiness. When Whitney does eventually find out about Lee's unfaithfulness, Lauren supports her. She later starts a business as a web designer, with her first client being Belinda Peacock (Carli Norris). Steven is annoyed when Lauren buys a new laptop following a burglary at the Beales' restaurant. Steven tells Lauren he needed a way to pay debts and she promises not to tell Ian the truth about the burglary as long as they are honest with each other in future.

Lauren is excited when Louie says his first word: "mama". Steven gets him to say "dada" and records a video. Lauren sends it to Peter, which upsets Steven as he sees himself as Louie's father, but Lauren says Peter will always be Louie's father. When Jane discovers Steven has been stealing money from the restaurant, he explains he borrowed it to pay Peter's debts as he is drinking heavily and getting into fights, and Lauren does not know the whole truth. When Lauren learns this, she is angry that he was not honest and considers visiting Peter. Steven says he wanted to protect her and Louie, and going to New Zealand out of guilt or pity will be a mistake, so she decides not to go. Lauren starts to worry that her relationship with Steven has become stale but she does manage to seduce him until they are interrupted. While visiting Max at work, Lauren meets Josh Hemmings (Eddie Eyre) and they share an attraction. Lauren insists on meeting up with him to see what happens. Josh suggests that Lauren apply for a job at the company he works for, Weyland & Co, where Max also works. Lauren is shocked that Josh is one of the interviewers as she thought he worked on the photocopier, so she leaves but Josh follows; she slaps him for lying but they kiss. Meanwhile, Steven is eager for a baby with Lauren but she would rather concentrate on her career, so Steven starts piercing holes in his condoms. Lauren reaches the final two for the job and Max asks Josh not to employ Lauren, and he makes sure someone else gets the job, however, Josh visits Lauren at home and offers her a different job, and he meets Steven and realises Lauren is in a relationship and has a child. Thanks to Abi, Steven becomes paranoid about Lauren and Josh's relationship and starts tracking Lauren's whereabouts via a mobile app. Lauren finds out she is pregnant, and books an appointment to discuss an abortion, soon after revealing her intentions to Abi, as she is not ready to have a second child. Max tells a disbelieving Lauren that Josh is engaged, then Josh admits he is getting married in November. Lauren surprises and annoys Abi by arranging a secret Father's Day visit from Oscar for Max, neglecting to tell Abi about it. However, this drives Abi to reveal the abortion to Steven, though he decides not to confront Lauren. Lauren tells Josh that she loves Steven but admits that there are no "fireworks", and tells Josh that she will not cheat on him, unaware that Steven has been spying on her with a secret camera. Unaware that Abi and Steven have embarked on an affair, Lauren realises she does not love Steven and plans on returning to New Zealand to make amends with Peter. However, Steven learns about her plans and lies to her that he has an inoperable brain tumour. Lauren is wracked with guilt and decides to remain in Walford. In another desperate attempt to keep her, Steven spontaneously proposes to her in the Queen Vic, which she accepts. Lauren then resigns from Weyland & Co and starts planning her and Steven's wedding, however, after a fire which he started at Ian's restaurant, he dies. Lauren is devastated. Abi tries to tell her that she is pregnant with Steven's baby but Lauren misinterprets it as gloating about her own abortion, so Abi says that she wishes Lauren died instead and that she never deserved Steven's love, causing Lauren to start drinking again. On the day of Steven's funeral, Lauren finds out he lied about having a brain tumour and destroys his wreaths. When she finds out that Steven has been cremated, she refuses to scatter his ashes. Abi decides to leave Walford to visit Tanya and when Lauren learns of this, she asks if she and Louie can join her. Abi agrees and they leave Walford together; unbeknownst to Lauren, Abi is secretly taking Steven's ashes with her.

Lauren returns and moves back in with Ian and asks Josh for her job back. Josh accepts and flirts with Lauren but she rejects him again, but after numerous attempts, Lauren eventually gives into temptation and kisses Josh. When Josh's former fiancée, Imogen (Alexandra Sinclair) arrives unexpectedly at the office, she belittles Lauren and tells her that Josh dislikes children. To confirm this, Lauren asks Josh if he would like to spend time with her and Louie; he reluctantly accepts, but implies that they should go as a couple instead which displeases Lauren. Josh later tries to declare his love for her and asks why they cannot be together; she explains that they are different people and that she is a recovering alcoholic. Kathy advises Lauren to move on from Steven and pursue Josh, which she does and they start a relationship. Lauren discovers Weyland & Co's Project Dagmar, a plan to develop Albert Square into luxury apartments, and photographs a scale model. She threatens to publicise the project but her boss James Willmott-Brown (William Boyde), who is also Josh's father, convinces Lauren that the project has fallen through due to investors dropping out at the last minute and she deletes the photo. Josh confirms this, having only just heard about the project. However, it emerges that this was a lie and that Weyland & Co have bought several properties in Albert Square and are evicting business owners. Lauren refuses to give an eviction notice to Ian, so is fired. She discovers that Max is involved in the plan to con the residents. Willmott-Brown destroys Max's contract, revealing that he has also been manipulated, but Josh gives Lauren a copy as he is entitled to his share. Lauren asks Max for the truth or she will destroy the copy, but he destroys it himself, saying that he knew about Abi's affair with Steven and her pregnancy and that his plan was to exact revenge on those who abandoned him. Later, Josh tells Lauren that he can stop the development by revealing that Willmott-Brown bribes members of Walford Council. Josh asks Lauren to stall Willmott-Brown and Fi Browning (Lisa Faulkner) at a press launch so he can get evidence of the bribes, so she chains herself to their property, but is arrested for breach of the peace. Lauren is cautioned and released, and then kisses Josh when he says he has left Weyland, though his plan has failed. Josh is offered a new job in Glasgow and Lauren agrees to move there with him. Ian disapproves of her relationship with Josh when he catches them kissing which causes Lauren to slap Ian, but Kathy convinces him that Josh is not like his father. On Christmas Day, Max gives Lauren a thoughtful Christmas present and she tells him that he needs medical help. Tanya returns to take Lauren and Abi away from Walford, revealing that Max killed Steven and tried to kill Jane. Lauren and Abi reject Max. Max goes to the roof of The Vic where he plans to kill himself by jumping off, but Lauren and Abi climb on to the ledge to try and stop him. As Max agrees to come down, Lauren slips and she and Abi both fall off. They are taken to hospital, where Lauren has surgery on her pelvis, which is fractured, and Abi has a CT scan and is declared brainstem dead. When Lauren starts physiotherapy, she becomes frustrated with not being told the truth about Abi and breaks down when she sees her. Lauren slaps Max for lying to her about Abi's condition and is devastated by Abi's death. Lauren is distraught when Abi's life support is withdrawn.

Before Abi's funeral, Lauren lies to Max that it has already taken place because Tanya does not want him there, however, he realises it is a lie. On the day of the funeral, Lauren tells Whitney about her planned move to Scotland with Josh and Whitney asks her to be sure that she actually loves him or if she is only with him because he is good with Louie. After the service, she sees Max going into the chapel and tells him that she needs to leave, before hugging him and crying. Lauren then takes Louie from Josh and walks away without him. Cora later reveals that Lauren has moved to New Zealand, possibly reuniting with Peter.

Several months later, Ian agrees to babysit Louie while Lauren and Peter patch up their relationship. Shortly afterwards, Kathy calls Ian to tell Lauren and Peter that Bobby is being released from prison. However, Ian tells her that Lauren is refusing to forgive Bobby for ruining her relationship with her dad and causing Abi's death. In February 2020, Jack reveals to Max that Lauren and Peter have split up again and he has been aiding Lauren with money. In November 2020, Lauren's house in New Zealand burns down and she asks Peter, who is back in Walford, to send over money. Later, Max makes plans to visit Lauren with his lover Linda Carter (Kellie Bright), but eventually leaves for New Zealand alone when Linda rejects him. Lauren briefly returns to Walford in December 2022 for Dot's funeral, where she comforts Jack and her cousin Sonia Fowler (Natalie Cassidy). She explains that Tanya has been aiding Cora who injured her hip, and they are both unable to attend. She also explains that she is not on speaking terms with Max after she caught him in bed with her best friend, and argues with Linda over her breaking Max's heart after their affair. Later, Lauren joins other Walford residents at Sonia's house to celebrate Dot's life.

Creation and development

Casting and characterisation
 Lauren is described by the BBC website as an "outsider" and "doesn't care what people think". It continues: "Lauren is very quick on the uptake and picks up on everything going on around her but knows it doesn't pay to have loose lips. She's learnt the hard way that secrets destroy people. And this has made her vulnerable."

Lauren Branning was introduced in 2006 by executive producer Kate Harwood. She and her immediate family—father Max (Jake Wood), mother Tanya (Jo Joyner) and sister Abi (Lorna Fitzgerald)—are an extension of the popular and long-running Jackson/Branning clan, who have appeared in the series since 1993. It was announced in May 2006 that Lauren would be played by actress Madeline Duggan.  Duggan was replaced by Jacqueline Jossa, with Duggan's final scenes airing on 23 June 2010.

Recast

On 9 May 2010 it was announced that Duggan had been axed from the soap by executive producer Bryan Kirkwood and that she had already filmed her exit scenes. Her final episode was broadcast on 23 June 2010. In August 2010, it was announced that the character would be returning later in the year, now played by Jacqueline Jossa. Of her casting in the show, Jossa said "I was so excited when I got the call to say I'd got the part in EastEnders. I've always been a massive fan of the show and it's a dream come true. The character of Lauren Branning will be really fun to play and there are some exciting things coming up". Kirkwood said "I'm delighted to welcome Jacqueline Jossa to Albert Square. Jacqueline's portrayal of Lauren has all the classic Branning qualities of toughness, cynicism and sensitivity. Jacqueline is set to be at the heart of Walford drama for some time to come". It was reported that Lauren's return would show a more grown-up side to the character, who will cause trouble but also show a softer side as she attempts to find love.

Jossa's first appearance was on 27 September 2010. Jossa said that when she first got the part of Lauren, she "worried unnecessarily". Talking to PA, Jossa said that working with Joyner and Wood was not as scary as she thought. She commented: "There was less pressure than I thought there was going to be. When I first started I got really scared and worked up, thinking everyone's going to hate me. They've been there four years and then I'm coming in to be their daughter – it was a bit surreal. And then two weeks later I felt completely comfortable, everyone was cracking jokes and I thought, 'Oh... I built it up a bit!'"

Storyline development
Lauren's primary storylines concerned a school girl romance with Peter Beale (Thomas Law), a friendship with the delinquent Lucy Beale (Melissa Suffield), and being caught in the middle of her warring parents, who separated in the serial in 2007 when Tanya discovered Max was cheating on her with Stacey Slater (Lacey Turner), Lauren's half brother Bradley's wife. In the storyline, Lauren played an integral part in the discovery of the affair; as a result of a practical joke, Lauren unwittingly recorded Max and Stacey kissing on video camera, and sent the recording to Bradley as a Christmas present in December 2007 as means of revenge on her father. Despite a change of heart, the recording was seen by the entire Branning family on Christmas Day, an episode that drew 13.9 million viewers, 55.3% of the total audience share.

The character became involved in one of EastEnders''' most controversial storylines in 2008, when she was groomed by a paedophile, Tony King (Chris Coghill). Tony King had been introduced in September 2008 as the fiancé of Lauren's cousin Bianca Jackson (Patsy Palmer). However, in a plot twist, it was revealed that Tony was already in a sexual relationship with Bianca's 15-year-old stepdaughter Whitney Dean (Shona McGarty). After losing interest in Whitney, Tony turns his attentions to 14-year-old Lauren. An insider said: "He has got away with abusing Whitney for years but it seems one young girl isn't enough."

In April 2011, it was announced that Lauren is to have a relationship with already established character, Ryan Malloy.  An EastEnders insider commented: "Sparks will fly when Ryan and Lauren begin their relationship. Max is certainly someone not to mess with. He's already very protective of his daughters and Ryan isn't exactly his favourite person after his relationship with Stacey, who Max will always hold a torch for."

Jossa explained that upon Lauren finding out about Tanya's cancer, viewers see a different side to Lauren. She told Inside Soap: "Immediately, there's a change in her – with Tanya so sick, Lauren has to grow up. You'd expect her to dive into the drink again or something like that, but she's right there for Tanya from the minute she finds out what's going on." She continues: "Tanya is still convinced she'll be fine, but then she finds out that the cancer has begun to spread. Tanya's really vulnerable at that point and it's Lauren who's saying, 'We're going to fix this and everything will be fine'. She's there for her mum the whole time – shopping, cooking, cleaning, looking after Abi and Oscar. She really wants to help Tanya and actually enjoys the responsibility."

Alcoholism
In January 2012, Jossa praised her storyline in which Lauren starts binge drinking due to the stress of her mother suffering from cancer. Jossa commented on the storyline saying that teenagers should take binge drinking more seriously. She said: "It's good EastEnders have done the storyline. It highlights that teenagers who people label irresponsible could be doing it to deal with worries they are keeping to themselves. What they actually need is help or someone to talk to. At first to Lauren drinking was a laugh. Then it became a way of forgetting – she has carried the burden of keeping her mum's illness secret." Speaking about Lauren's love life, Jossa added: "I always want Lauren and Fatboy to get together. They would make such a cute couple."

Jossa predicted in November 2012 that Lauren will revert to her old ways after her latest relationship break-up. When asked if Lauren would start drinking again, Jossa said that Lauren did not really stop and that alcohol is her "comfort blanket". Executive Producer Lorraine Newman said that Lauren's binge drinking will "come to a head" in Spring 2013. Newman commented "Lauren's obviously very troubled. A huge amount of what we're seeing now is to do with what's been going on with her parents for such a long time. It's a tough one covering the issue of binge drinking because inevitably, in order for it to have sufficient impact, it has to go on for a considerable amount of time. There's a real danger that it will become unpalatable and that you won't have too much empathy for the character." Newman also added that the binge drinking storyline will come to a conclusion in 2013.

In March 2013, it was revealed that Lauren is to have her drink spiked by her friend Lucy Beale. Lauren gave up her binge drinking to save her relationship with Joey but Lucy cannot stand seeing them happy together and decides she wants Joey back after a brief fling. Lucy spikes Lauren's drink and Lauren becomes extremely drunk and makes a fool of herself. Joey dumps Lauren as he thinks she has drinking behind her back and Lauren's life spirals out of control. An insider told the Daily Star "It's going to be emotional to watch Lauren go through it all again as she's already been through so many battles with the bottle." Hetti Bywater said that she will continue her scheming until she gets Joey back.

Relationship with Joey Branning
In September 2012, Alison Rowley of Digital Spy said that Lauren will fall in love with her cousin Joey Branning (David Witts). An EastEnders insider told the Daily Star that it will be a huge storyline across the autumn. The insider said "Lauren hits the booze and shows her vulnerable side to Joey. He's there for her and feels very protective. The more time they spend together the more they start to realise their feelings for each other are not just that of cousins." As the chemistry between the pair intensifies, they try to hide the relationship from their parents. The insider said that it is a powerful force and that the attraction between them is so strong that it will take something huge to "stop them jumping into bed". Daniel Kilkelly later revealed that Lauren and Joey will be in a "horrifying" car crash. Filming for scenes begun on 10 September and is thought that the on-location filming will continue through the week. The details of the storyline are being kept under wraps but Digital Spy reports that Lauren will joyride her uncle Derek Branning's (Jamie Foreman) car but it goes horribly wrong and their lives are left hanging in the balance when Lauren loses control of the car and goes through a shop window. An insider commented "Everyone is really excited about these scenes. It's going to be a huge storyline for us in a few weeks' time, so it's definitely one for the fans to watch out for." The storyline will reportedly air in November 2012 and is said to be one of the show's biggest moments of the year.

Lauren is later dumped by Joey after Derek blackmails him. Witts said that Joey will find life "really hard" after dumping Lauren. Derek suggests to Joey that if he tells the police that he was driving the car that drunken Lauren crashed, she can avoid a prison sentence. Joey agrees to the deception to help Lauren but is later horrified when Derek threatens to tell the police the truth unless he gets his own way. Speaking to Soaplife, Witts said "Joey must either move in with Derek and be a respectful and loving son, or dump Lauren. If Joey takes either of those options, Derek won't tell the police that Lauren was driving the car. Joey's love for Lauren is massive, but not quite as massive as his hatred for Derek. He decides to become the villain and lie that he never loved her. He'll take the flack because that will make it easier for her to move on without him." Witts also added that it will be "really hard" as he keeps making out to Lauren that he is not interested. Witts also said that Joey would be making a mistake if he told Lauren about Derek's blackmail. He commented "She's very headstrong and she'd say that she doesn't care about getting into trouble with the law. It would all end in tears. Everyone would find out as Lauren's the sort of person who'd blurt everything out, and it would cause even more of a mess. Joey very much thinks he's doing the right thing." Tony Discipline said that he does not mind watching Jossa's, his real-life girlfriend's scenes and that he supports the Joey and Lauren plot commenting "I don't find it strange to watch – it is part of the job. We always support each other and Jacqueline always asks me how it looks. But it is part of our job."

Departure (2018)
On 10 September 2017, it was announced that Jossa had been axed from the show by executive consultant John Yorke, along with Lorna Fitzgerald. An official spokesperson said: "We can confirm Jacqueline and Lorna will be leaving. They have been wonderful to work with and we wish them all the best for the future." Their exit story started airing during the Christmas period of 2017. Jossa's departure aired on 16 February 2018. In December 2019, after Jossa won the nineteenth series of I'm a Celebrity...Get Me Out of Here!, it was revealed she had been asked back to EastEnders as Lauren four months previously by producers Kate Oates and Jon Sen, however she turned the offer down in favour of I'm a Celebrity...Get Me Out of Here!.

 Return (2022) 
In October 2022, Jossa was announced as one of several former cast members who would be returning to EastEnders for the funeral of Dot Branning (June Brown), in a special tribute episode following Brown's death in April 2022. Speaking of her return, Jossa said: "Coming back to EastEnders for Dot's funeral was a no-brainer, and it was a real honour to be invited back. I had a lot of fun but, of course, it was bittersweet. It was amazing to be back, but hard to be filming this storyline. I can tell the viewers know that Dot gets the beautiful send-off that she deserves. June was the light and joy of EastEnders. I had so much fun working with her, the incredible stories and how infectious and witty she was. June is a legend and I miss her very much."

Lauren's Diaries
Following Jossa's first appearance, Lauren started appearing in her own internet spin-off series, Lauren's Diaries, and a second series started in 2011.

ReceptionInside Soap commented on Lauren's recasting describing Lauren played by Duggan was "a pretty lass, but pretty unimpressive" and that played by Jossa she has acquired "an attitude as severe as her fringe". Jane Simon from the Daily Mirror said that Lauren played by Jossa "brings some badly needed oomph to the part". Jossa won Best Newcomer at the National Television Awards 2012. Executive Producer Bryan Kirkwood commented: "I'd like to say a huge congratulations to our girl, Jacqueline Jossa, for her amazing success. It's well-deserved recognition of Jacqueline's beautiful, truthful and moving portrayal of Lauren Branning." A writer for the Daily Mirror said that all of Lauren's problems are caused by her being a Branning. In August 2017, Jossa was longlisted for Sexiest Female at the Inside Soap Awards, while Steven's brain tumour lie to Lauren was longlisted for Best Shock Twist. Jossa's Sexiest Female nomination made the viewer-voted shortlist, but she lost out to Natalie J. Robb, who portrays Moira Dingle in Emmerdale. The scene in which Lauren and Abi fall from the roof of The Queen Vic was awarded "Scene of the Year" at the 2018 British Soap Awards, tying with Doctors'' who also won the same award for "The Bollywood Proposal".

See also
List of EastEnders characters (2006)
"Who Killed Lucy Beale?"

References

External links

EastEnders characters
Television characters introduced in 2006
Fictional market stallholders
Child characters in television
Fictional salespeople
Fictional alcohol abusers
Fictional cannabis users
Fictional beauticians
Fictional waiting staff
Fictional female businesspeople
Fictional characters involved in incest
Female characters in television
Teenage characters in television
Branning family